Dog tag is an informal but common term for a specific type of identification tag worn by military personnel. The tags' primary use is for the identification of casualties; they have information about the individual  written on them, including identification and essential basic medical information such as blood type and history of inoculations. They often indicate religious preference as well.

Dog tags are usually fabricated from a corrosion-resistant metal. They commonly contain two copies of the information, either in the form of a single tag that can be broken in half, or as two identical tags on the same chain. This purposeful duplication allows one tag, or half-tag, to be collected from an individual's dead body for notification, while the duplicate remains with the corpse if the conditions of battle prevent it from being immediately recovered. The term arose and became popular because of the tags' resemblance to animal registration tags.

History 

The earliest mention of an identification tag for soldiers comes in Polyaenus (Stratagems 1.17) where the Spartans wrote their names on sticks tied to their left wrists. A type of dog tag ("signaculum") was given to the Roman legionary at the moment of enrollment. The legionary "signaculum" was a lead disk with a leather string, worn around the neck, with the name of the recruit and the indication of the legion of which the recruit was part. This procedure, together with enrollment in the list of recruits, was made at the beginning of a four-month probatory period ("probatio"). The recruit obtained the military status only after the oath of allegiance ("sacramentum") at the end of "probatio", meaning that from a legal point of view the "signaculum" was given to a subject who was no longer a civilian, but not yet in the military.

In more recent times, dog tags were provided to Chinese soldiers as early as the mid-19th century. During the Taiping revolt (1851–66), both the Imperialists (i.e., the Chinese Imperial Army regular servicemen) and those Taiping rebels wearing a uniform wore wooden dog tags at the belt, bearing the soldier's name, age, birthplace, unit, and date of enlistment.

American Civil War 
During the American Civil War from 1861–1865, some soldiers pinned paper notes with their name and home address to the backs of their coats. Other soldiers stenciled identification on their knapsacks or scratched it in the soft lead backing of their army belt buckles.

Manufacturers of identification badges recognized a market and began advertising in periodicals. Their pins were usually shaped to suggest a branch of service, and engraved with the soldier's name and unit. Machine-stamped tags were also made of brass or lead with a hole and usually had (on one side) an eagle or shield, and such phrases as "War for the Union" or "Liberty, Union, and Equality". The other side had the soldier's name and unit, and sometimes a list of battles in which he had participated. To the right is an image of First Sergeant Henry Correll of the 2nd Vermont Volunteer Infantry. To learn more on Sergeant (later Lieutenant) Correll, please see the reference.

Franco-Prussian War
On a volunteer basis Prussian soldiers had decided to wear identification tags in the Austro-Prussian War of 1866. However, many rejected dog tags as a bad omen for their lives. So until eight months after the Battle of Königgrätz, with almost 8,900 Prussian casualties, only 429 of them could be identified. With the formation of the North German Confederation in 1867 Prussian military regulations became binding for the militaries of all North German member states. With the Prussian Instruktion über das Sanitätswesen der Armee im Felde (i.e., instruction on the medical corps organisation of the army afield) issued on 29 April 1869 identification tags (then called Erkennungsmarke; literally "recognition mark") were to be handed out to each soldier before deployment afield. The Prussian Army issued identification tags for its troops at the beginning of the Franco-Prussian War in 1870. They were nicknamed Hundemarken (the German equivalent of "dog tags") and compared to a similar identification system instituted by the dog licence fee, adding tags to collars of those dogs whose owners paid the fee, in the Prussian capital city of Berlin at around the same time period.

World War I

The British Army introduced identity discs in place of identity cards in 1907, in the form of aluminium discs, typically made at regimental depots using machines similar to those common at fun fairs, the details being pressed into the thin metal one letter at a time.

Army Order 287 of September 1916 required the British Army provide all soldiers with two official tags, both made of vulcanised asbestos fibre (which were more comfortable to wear in hot climates) carrying identical details, again impressed one character at a time. The first tag, an octagonal green disc, was attached to a long cord around the neck. The second tag, a circular red disc, was threaded on a 6-inch cord suspended from the first tag. The first tag was intended to remain on the body for future identification, while the second tag could be taken to record the death.

British and Empire/Commonwealth forces (Australia, Canada, and New Zealand) were issued essentially identical identification discs of basic pattern during the Great War, Second World War and Korea, though official identity discs were frequently supplemented by private-purchase items such as identity bracelets, particularly favoured by sailors who believed the official discs were unlikely to survive long immersion in water.

The U.S. Army first authorized identification tags in War Department General Order No. 204, dated December 20, 1906, which essentially prescribes the Kennedy identification tag:

The U.S. Army changed regulations on July 6, 1916, so that all soldiers were issued two tags: one to stay with the body and the other to go to the person in charge of the burial for record-keeping purposes. In 1918, the U.S. Army adopted and allotted the service number system, and name and service numbers were ordered stamped on the identification tags.

World War II "notched" tags

There is a recurring myth about the notch situated in one end of the dog tags issued to United States Army personnel during World War II, and up until the Korean War era. It was rumored that the notch's purpose was that, if a soldier found one of his comrades on the battlefield, he could take one tag to the commanding officer and stick the other between the teeth of the soldier to ensure that the tag would remain with the body and be identified.

In reality, the notch was used with the Model 70 Addressograph Hand Identification Imprinting Machine (a pistol-type imprinter used primarily by the Medical Department during World War II). American dogtags of the 1930s through 1980s were produced using a Graphotype machine, in which characters are debossed into metal plates. Some tags are still debossed, using earlier equipment, and some are embossed (with raised letters) on computer-controlled equipment.

In the Graphotype process, commonly used commercially from the early 1900s through the 1980s, a debossing machine was used to stamp characters into metal plates; the plates could then be used to repetitively stamp such things as addresses onto paper in the same way that a typewriter functions, except that a single stroke of the printer could produce a block of text, rather than requiring each character to be printed individually. The debossing process creates durable, easily legible metal plates, well-suited for military identification tags, leading to adoption of the system by the American military. It was also realized that debossed tags can function the same way the original Graphotype plates do.

The Model 70 took advantage of this fact, and was intended to rapidly print all of the information from a soldier's dogtag directly onto medical and personnel forms, with a single squeeze of the trigger. However, this requires that the tag being inserted with the proper orientation (stamped characters facing down), and it was believed that battlefield stress could lead to errors. To force proper orientation of the tags, the tags are produced with a notch, and there is a locator tab inside the Model 70 which prevents the printer from operating if the tag is inserted with the notch in the wrong place (as it is if the tag is upside down).

This feature was not as useful in the field as had been hoped, however, due to adverse conditions such as weather, dirt and dust, water, etc. In addition, the Model 70 resembled a pistol, thus attracting the attention of snipers (who might assume that a man carrying a pistol was an officer). As a result, use of the Model 70 hand imprinter by field medics was rapidly abandoned (as were most of the Model 70s themselves), and eventually the specification that tags include the locator notch was removed from production orders. Existing stocks of tags were used until depleted, and in the 1960s it was not uncommon for a soldier to be issued one tag with the notch and one tag without. Notched tags are still in production, to satisfy the needs of hobbyists, film production, etc., while the Model 70 imprinter has become a rare collector's item.

It appears instructions that would confirm the notch's mythical use were issued at least unofficially by the Graves Registration Service during the Vietnam War to Army troops headed overseas.

Dog tags are traditionally part of the makeshift battlefield memorials soldiers created for their fallen comrades. The casualty's rifle with bayonet affixed is stood vertically atop the empty boots, with the helmet over the rifle's stock. The dog tags hang from the rifle's handle or trigger guard.

Non-military usage

Medical condition identification

Some tags (along with similar items such as MedicAlert bracelets) are used also by civilians to identify their wearers and specify them as having health problems that may 
(a) suddenly incapacitate their wearers and render them incapable of providing treatment guidance (as in the cases of heart problems, epilepsy, diabetic coma, accident or major trauma) and/or  
(b) interact adversely with medical treatments, especially standard or "first-line" ones (as in the case of an allergy to common medications) and/or 
(c) provide in case of emergency ("ICE") contact information and/or  
(d) state a religious, moral, or other objection to artificial resuscitation, if a first responder attempts to administer such treatment when the wearer is non-responsive and thus unable to warn against doing so. A DNR signed by a physician is still required in some states.

Military personnel in some jurisdiction may wear a supplementary medical information tag.

Fashion 
Dog tags have found their way into youth fashion as military chic. Originally worn as a part of a military uniform by youth wishing to present a tough or militaristic image, dog tags have since reached wider fashion circles. They may be inscribed with a person's details, beliefs or tastes, a favorite quote, or may bear the name or logo of a band or performer. The wearing of dog tags as a fashion accessory can be considered disrespectful by some military personnel.

Since the late 1990s, custom dog tags have been fashionable amongst musicians (particularly rappers), and as a marketing give-away item. Numerous companies  offer customers the opportunity to create their own personalized dog tags with their own photos, logos, and text. Even high-end jewellers  have featured gold and silver dog tags encrusted with diamonds and other jewels.

Variations by country

Austria 

The Austrian Bundesheer used a single long, rectangular tag, with oval ends, stamped with blood group & Rh factor at the end, with ID number underneath. Two slots and a hole stamped beneath allows the tag to be broken in halves, and the long bottom portion has both the ID number and a series of holes which allows the tag to be inserted into a dosimeter. This has been replaced with a more conventional, wider and rounded rectangle which can still be halved, but lacks the dosimeter reading holes.

Australia 

The Australian Defence Force issues soldiers two tags of different shapes, one octagonal and one circular, containing the following information:
 AS (denoting Australia, previously both AU and AUST have been used)
 PMKeyS/Service number
 First initial
 Last name
 Religious abbreviation (e.g. RC – Roman Catholic, NREL – No religion)
 Blood group

The information is printed exactly the same on both discs. In the event of a casualty, the circular tag is removed from the body.

Belgium 

Belgian Forces identity tags are, like the Canadian and Norwegian, designed to be broken in two in case of fatality; the lower half is returned to Belgian Defence tail, while the upper half remains on the body. The tags contain the following information:

 Upper half:
 Belgisch Leger (Belgian Army) and Date of Birth in DD/MM/YYYY format.
 Surname with the addition of the first letter of given name.
 Service number and blood group with RH factor and optionally religion.
 Lower half: identical.
 Example:
 Belgisch Leger 01/01/1991
 Surname J
 1234567  O+    KATH

Canada 

Canadian Forces identity discs (abbreviated "ID discs") are designed to be broken in two in the case of fatality; the lower half is returned to National Defence Headquarters with the member's personal documents, while the upper half remains on the body. The tags contain the following information:
 Upper half:
 Service Number (SN)
 Initials and surname
 Religion (or "NRE" if none) and blood group with RH factor
 The legend "CDN FORCES CDN" (or for foreign nationals, the name of the country the individual represents)
 The text "DO NOT REMOVE / NE PAS ENLEVER" on the reverse
 Lower half: identical, except no blood group or RH factor and the reverse is blank.

Before the Service Number was introduced in the 1990s, military personnel were identified on the ID discs (as well as other documents) by their social insurance number.

China 

The People's Liberation Army issues two long, rectangular tags. All information is stamped in Simplified Chinese:

 Full name
 Gender
 Date of birth
 RIC number
 PLA's ID number
 Blood type
 Branch

PLA is introducing a two-dimensional matrix code on the second tag, the matrix code contains a link to the official database. This allows the inquirer get more details about the military personnel.

Colombia 

The Ejército Nacional de Colombia uses long, rectangular metal tags with oval ends tags stamped with the following information:

 Family Name
 First Name
 Military ID Number
 Blood Type
 Branch of Service

Duplicate tags are issued. Often, tags are issued with a prayer inscribed on the reverse.

Cyprus 

In Cyprus, identification tags include the following information:

 Surname
 First name
 Service number (E.g., 11111/00/00B, where the first five digits are the ID, the second two are the year the soldier turned 18 years old, the last two digits are the year the soldier enlisted, and the letter is the enlistment group, either A or B)
 Blood Group

Denmark 

The military of Denmark use dog tags made from small, rectangular metal plates. The tag is designed to be broken into two pieces each with the following information stamped onto it:

 Personal identification number
 Surname
 First name

Additionally, the right hand side of each half-tag is engraved .
Starting in 1985, the individual's service number (which is the same as the social security number) is included on the tag. In case the individual dies, the lower half-tag is supposed to be collected, while the other will remain with the corpse. In the army, navy, and air force but not in the national guard, the individual's blood type is indicated on the lower half-tag only, since this information becomes irrelevant if the individual dies. In 2009, Danish dog tags were discontinued for conscripts.

East Germany 

The Nationale Volksarmee used a tag nearly identical to that used by both the Wehrmacht and the West German Bundeswehr. The oval aluminum tag was stamped "DDR" (Deutsche Demokratische Republik) above the personal ID number; this information was repeated on the bottom half, which was intended to be broken off in case of death. Oddly, the tag was not worn (but would have been in case of war), but required to be kept in a plastic sleeve in the back of the WDA ("Wehrdienstausweis") identity booklet.

Ecuador 

The Placas de identificación de campaña consists of two long, rectangular steel or aluminum tags with rounded corners and a single hole punched in one end. It is suspended by a US-type ball chain, with a shorter chain for the second tag. The information on the tag is:

 Family Name & First Name
 Identification Number
 Blood Group, plus "RH" and "+" or "-"

Estonia 

Estonian dog tags are designed to be broken in two. The dog tag is a metallic rounded rectangle suspended by a ball chain. Information consists of four fields:

 National identification number
 Nationality
 Blood Group
 Religion

Example: 
 39305231234
 EST
 A(II) Rh Pos (+)
 NO

Finland 

In the Finnish Defence Forces, "tunnuslevy" or WWII term "tuntolevy" (Finnish for "Identification plate") is made of stainless steel and designed to be broken in two; however, the only text on it is the personal identification number and the letters "FI" or "SF" in older models, which stands for Suomi Finland, within a tower stamped atop of the upper half.

France 

France issues either a metallic rounded rectangle (army) or disk (navy), designed to be broken in half, bearing family name & first name above the ID number.

Germany 

See above for former East Germany.

German Bundeswehr ID tags are an oval-shaped disc designed to be broken in half. They are made of stainless steel,  height and  width. The two sides contain different information which are mirrored upside-down on the lower half of the ID tag. They feature the following information on segmented and numbered fields:

On the front:

 Field 1: blank (provided for Gender but never used)
 Field 2: DEU (for Deutschland) (GE (for Germany) only on older ID tags)
 Field 3: Religious preference ("K" or "RK" for Roman Catholic, "E" or "EV" for Protestant, "O" for Christian Orthodox, "ISL" for Islamic, "JD" for Jewish, blank if no preference)
 Field 4: Personenkennziffer (service number: birth date in DDMMYY format, dash, capitalized first letter of last name, dash, and five-digit number based on soldier's home military administrative district, number of persons with the mentioned last name initial and same birthday, and an error-checking number but without dashes), ex. 101281-S-455(-)6(-)8

On the back:

 Field 5: Blood group (A, AB, B, 0)
 Field 6: Rh factor (Rh+ or Rh-)
 Field 7: Vaccination status ("T82" for Tetanus and year of basic immunization)
 Fields 8–10: blank

Bundesamt für Wehrtechnik und Beschaffung of 2009-12-21 specifies shape, materials and characteristics for four parts:

 Erkennungsmarke (identification tag) stainless steel ("Edelstahl")
 Erkennungsmarke, nicht magnetisierbar (identification tag, non-magnetizable) for personnel working for special tasks, non-magnetic stainless steel
 Sanitätswarnmarke, short Warnmarke (health warn tag) aluminium, anodized red, carried only if necessary with a second chain depending from the lower half of the ID tag
 Halskette (necklace) – Kugelkette DIN 5280, stainless steel – 2 parts: one long for neck and ID, one short for warn tag to ID tag.

The ID tag is landscape-oval, breakable in two halves with 4–8 manual bends. On the backside each half is 0.2 mm deep marked with "DEU" for Deutschland, the non-magnetic type on both halves and both sides with "NM".

The metal sheet is 0.7 mm thick, material codes X5CrNi1810 or 1.4301, weighs about 16 g. NM-variant shall consist of 1.4311 or 1.4401. Sharp edges have to be smoothed, then the plate electropolished. Mechanical deburring and ball polishing is allowed.

The letters stamped in for the person must stay readable after a glow test for 10 minutes in air at 1200 °C.

The ball chain is of X5CrNi1810, diameter of ball is 3.5 mm, that of the wire 1.5 mm. Closure is of 1.4301, stainless steel, too. The long chain is 680 + 30 mm long, the short one 145 + 7 mm. Breaking force of the chain  including the closure must reach 100 N, after 10 min glow at 1200 °C in air at least 10 N.

Greece 

In Greece, identification tags include the following information:
 Surname
 First name
 Service number (where date of birth is included as "class")
 Blood Group

Hungary 

The Hungarian army dog tag is made out of steel, forming a 25×35 mm tag designed to split diagonally. Both sides contain the same information: the soldier's personal identity code, blood group and the word HUNGARIA. Some may not have the blood group on them. These are only issued to soldiers who are serving outside of the country. If the soldier should die, one side is removed and kept for the army's official records, while the other side is left attached to the body.

Iraq 

The Saddam-era Iraqi Army used a single, long, rectangular metal tag with oval ends, inscribed (usually by hand) with Name and Number or Unit, and occasionally Blood Type.

Israel 

Dog tags of the Israel Defense Forces are designed to be broken in two. The information appears in three lines (twice):
Army identification number ("mispar ishi", literally "personal number". A seven-digit number that is different from the nine-digit identification number for citizens).
 Last name
 First Name
 Blood Type (ABO group - in some years)

Recruits are issued with 2 Dogtags (4 halves total), one remains whole and worn on a necklace, and the second is broken into its halves and placed in each military boot for the purpose of Identifying dead soldiers (IDF Military Boots contain pouches on their inner sides at the 1/3 calf height, the pouches have holes corresponding in size and placement to those on the discs, allowing for fastening, often via small cable ties).

Originally the IDF issued two circular aluminum tags (1948 – late 1950s) stamped in three lines with serial number, family name, and first name. The tags were threaded together through a single hole onto a cord worn around the neck.

Italy 

Rectangular piece, 35x45 mm, designed to be broken in two. Includes soldier's first and last name, coded date and place of birth, identification number, religious affiliation, and blood group.

Japan 

Japan follows a similar system to the US Army for its Japan Self-Defense Forces personnel, and the appearance of the tags is similar, although laser etched. The exact information order is as follows.

 Japan Ground Self-Defense Force
 JAPAN GSDF
 First name, last name
 Identification number
 Blood type
 Japan Maritime Self-Defense Force
 First name, last name
 Identification number
 JAPAN MSDF
 Blood type
 Japan Air Self-Defense Force
 First name, last name
 Identification number
 JAPAN ASDF
 Blood type

Malaysia 

Malaysian Armed Forces have two identical oval tags with this information:
 NRIC number (The last digit is an odd number for a male soldier, and an even number for a female soldier.)
 Service number
 Full name
 Blood type
 Religion
 Branch (e.g., TLDM)

If more information needed, another two oval wrist tags are provided. The term wrist tags can be used to refer to the bracelet-like wristwatch. The additional tags only need to be worn on the wrist, with the main tags still on the neck. All personnel are allowed to attach a small religious pendant or locket; this makes a quick identifiable reference for their funeral services.

Mexico 

The Mexican Army uses two long identity tags, very similar to the ones used in the United States Army. They are rectangular metal tags with oval ends, embossed with name, serial number, and blood type, plus Rh factor.

Netherlands 

Dutch military identity tags, like the Canadian and Norwegian ones, are designed to be broken in two in case of a fatality; the lower end is returned to Dutch Defence Headquarters, while the upper half remains on the body.

The tags contain the following information:

 Upper half:
 Name and family name
 Service number
 Nationality and religion
 Blood group with RH factor
 Lower half: identical.

There is a difference in the Army and Air Force service number and the Navy service number:
The Army and Air Force service number is made up of the date of birth in YY.MM.DD. format, for example 83.01.15, and a three-digit number, such as 123.
The Navy service number is made up out of random five- or six-digit numbers.

Norway 

Norwegian dog tags are designed to be broken in two like the Canadian and the Dutch version:

 The top half contains the nationality, the eleven-digit birth number and the blood type.
 The bottom half contains the nationality and birth number and has a hole so the broken-off half can be hung on a ring.

Poland 

The first dog tags were issued in Poland following the order of the General Staff of December 12, 1920. The earliest design (dubbed kapala in Polish, more properly called "kapsel legitymacyjny" - meaning "identification cap") consisted of a tin-made 30×50 mm rectangular frame and a rectangular cap fitting into the frame. Soldiers' details were filled in a small ID card placed inside the frame, as well as on the inside of the frame itself. The dog tag was similar to the tags used by the Austro-Hungarian Army during World War I. In case the soldier died, the frame was left with his body, while the lid was returned to his unit together with a note on his death. The ID card was handed over to the chaplain or the rabbi.

In 1928, a new type of dog tag was proposed by gen. bryg. Stanisław Rouppert, Poland's representative at the International Red Cross. It was slightly modified and adopted in 1931 under the name of Nieśmiertelnik wz. 1931 (literally "Immortalizer mark 1931"). The new design consisted of an oval piece of metal (ideally steel, but in most cases aluminum alloy was used), roughly 40 by 50 millimeters. There were two notches on both sides of the tag, as well as two rectangular holes in the middle to allow for easier breaking of the tag in two halves. The halves contained the same set of data and were identical, except the upper half had two holes for a string or twine to go through. The data stamped on the dog tag from 2008 (wz. 2008) included:

 Name
 Surname
 ID number (PESEL- Universal Electronic System for Registration of the Population)
 "blank"
 Blood Group
 
with the name of Polish Army "Siły Zbrojne RP" and Polish Emblem.

Rhodesia 

The former Republic of Rhodesia used two WW2 British-style compressed asbestos fiber tags, a No. 1 octagonal (grey) tag and a No. 2 circular (red) tag, stamped with identical information. The red tag was supposedly fireproof and the grey tag rotproof. The following information was stamped on the tags: Number, Name, Initials, & Religion; Blood Type was stamped on reverse. The air force and BSAP often stamped their service on the reverse side above the blood group.

Russia 

The Russian Armed Forces use oval metal tags, similar to the dog tags of the Soviet Army. Each tag contains the title  and the individual's alphanumeric number, as shown on the photo.

Singapore 

The Singapore Armed Forces-issued dog tags are inscribed (not embossed) with up to four items:
 NRIC number
 Blood type
 Religion
 Drug allergies (if any; inscribed on the reverse)

The dog tags consist of two metal pieces, one oval with two holes and one round with one hole. A synthetic lanyard is threaded through both holes in the oval piece and tied around the wearer's neck. The round piece is tied to the main loop on a shorter loop.

South Africa 

The South African Defense Force use two long, rectangular stainless steel tags with oval ends, stamped with serial number, name and initials, religion, and blood type.

South Korea 

The South Korean army issues two long, rectangular tags with oval ends, stamped (in Korean lettering). The tags are worn on the neck with a ball chain. The tags contain the information listed below:
 Branch (Army, Air Force, Navy, Marines)
 Service Number; the first two digits state the starting year of service and the other eight digits state the specific unit of the person.
 Name
 Blood group followed by Rh factor

South Vietnam 

The South Vietnamese Army and the South Vietnamese Navy used two American-style dog tags. Some tags added religion on the back, e.g., Phật Giáo for Buddhist. They were stamped or inscribed with: 
Name
SQ (Số Quân, i.e., Service number) a 2-digit year number, followed by a military serial number
LM (loại máu, i.e., Blood Group, rH factor)

Soviet Union 

During World War II, the Red Army did not issue metal dog tags to its troops. They were issued small black Bakelite cylinders containing a slip of paper with a soldier's particulars written on it. These do not hold up as well as metal dog tags.
After World War II, the Soviet Army used oval metal tags, similar to today's dog tags of the Russian Armed forces. Each tag contains the title  and the individual's alphanumeric number.

Spain 

Issues a single metal oval, worn vertically, stamped "" above and below the 3-slot horizontal break line. It is stamped in 4 lines with:

 1st line – Religion
 2nd line – left side = blood group, right side = any medical allergies (SI or NO)
 3rd line – military service (ET, EA ...)
 4th (longest) line = DNI military number.

Sweden 

Swedish identification tags are designed to be able to break apart. The information on them was prior to 2010 and are as follows:

 Personal identity number (twice, once in the upper part and once below)
 Surname
first and middle name(s)
 Residence at birth
 Blood type (only on some)
County code
Issue year

Swedish dog tags issued to Armed Forces personnel after 2010 are, for personal security reasons, only marked with a personal identity number.

During the Cold War, dog tags were issued to everyone, often soon after birth, since the threat of total war also meant the risk of severe civilian casualties. However, in 2010, the Government decided that the dog tags were not needed anymore.

Switzerland 

Swiss Armed Forces ID tag is an oval shaped non reflective plaque, containing the following information:

 Social insurance number
 Surname
 First name
 Date of birth in DD.MM.YY format

On the back side the letters CH (standing for Confoederatio Helvetica) are engraved next to a Swiss cross.

United Kingdom 

The British Armed Forces currently use two circular non-reflecting stainless steel tags, referred to as "ID Disks", engraved with the following 'Big 5' details:

 Blood group
 Service Number
 Last name (Surname)
 Initials
 Religion (Abbreviated, e.g; R.C - Roman Catholic)	
 Branch ("RAF" - only for RAF members)

The discs are suspended from one long chain (24 inches long) and one short chain (4.5 inches long)

During World War One and Two, service personnel were issued pressed fibre identity disks, one green octagonal shaped disc, and a red round disc (some army units issued a second red round disc to be attached to the service respirator). The identity disks were hand stamped with the surname, initials, service number and religion of the holder and if in the Royal Air Force, the initials RAF. The disks were worn around the neck on a 38" length of cotton cord, this was often replaced by the wearer with a leather bootlace. One tag was suspended below the main tag.

The fibre identity disks in the RAF were still in use in 1999.

From 1960 these were replaced with stainless steel ID tags on a green nylon cord, two circular and one oval. The oval was withdrawn around 1990.

United States 

Tags are properly known as identification tags; the term "dog tags" has never been used in regulations.

The U.S. Armed Forces typically carry two identical oval dog tags containing:

U.S. Air Force (Pre-2019)
 Last name
 First name and middle initial
 Social Security number (Or DoD ID number post-2012), followed by "AF" indicating branch of service
 Blood Group
 Religion

U.S. Air Force (Modern)
 Last name
First name and middle initial
DoD ID number without hyphens
Blood group and Rh factor
Religious Preference

U.S. Marine Corps
 Last name
 First and middle initials and suffix; blood group
 EDIPI number
 Branch ("USMC"); Gas mask size (S – small, M – medium, L – large)
 Religious preference, or medical allergy if red medical tag

U.S. Navy (Historic, the U.S. Navy no longer issues dog tags)
 Last name, first name, middle initial
 Social Security number with no dashes or spaces followed immediately by "USN", space, blood group
 Religion

U.S. Army
 Last name
 First name middle initial
 Dept of Defense ID number (replaced Social Security number in November 2015)
 Blood type
 Religion

U.S. Coast Guard (Historic, the U.S. Coast Guard no longer issues dog tags)
 Last name, first name, middle initial
 Social Security number, no dashes or spaces, followed immediately by "USCG"
 Blood group
 Religion

Religious designation 

During World War II, an American dog tag could indicate only one of three religions through the inclusion of one letter: "P" for Protestant, "C" for Catholic, or "H" for Jewish (from the word, "Hebrew"), or (according to at least one source) "NO" to indicate no religious preference. Army regulations (606-5) soon included X and Y in addition to P, C, and H: the X indicating any religion not included in the first three, and the Y indicating either no religion or a choice not to list religion.
By the time of the Vietnam War, some IDs spelled out the broad religious choices such as PROTESTANT and CATHOLIC, rather than using initials, and also began to show individual denominations such as "METHODIST" or "BAPTIST." Tags did vary by service, however, such as the use of "CATH," not "CATHOLIC" on some Navy tags. For those with no religious affiliation and those who chose not to list an affiliation, either the space for religion was left blank or the words "NO PREFERENCE" or "NO RELIGIOUS PREF" (or the abbreviation "NO PREF") were included.

Although American dog tags currently include the recipient's religion as a way of ensuring that religious needs will be met, some personnel have them reissued without religious affiliation listed—or keep two sets, one with the designation and one without—out of fear that identification as a member of a particular religion could increase the danger to their welfare or their lives if they fell into enemy hands. Some Jewish personnel avoided flying over German lines during WWII with ID tags that indicated their religion, and some Jewish personnel avoid the religious designation today out of concern that they could be captured by extremists who are anti-Semitic. Additionally, when American troops were first sent to Saudi Arabia during the Gulf War there were allegations that some U.S. military authorities were pressuring Jewish military personnel to avoid listing their religions on their ID tags.

See also
 Medical tattoo, also known as a meat tag

Notes

External links

https://www.vermontcivilwar.org/get.php?input=1445 Article on Vermont in the Civil War, with specific reference to First Sergeant (later Lieutenant) Henry Correll of the 2nd Vermont Volunteer Infantry, and an image of his identification tag.
"A Battlefield Souvenir?" – The Story of a Union Identity Disk in the Civil War´
Captain Richard W. Wooley. "A Short History of Identification Tags". Quartermaster Professional Bulletin, December, 1988. Retrieved 12 September 2007.
"Evaluation of the WWII German ID tag system" - Article on the weak points of WWII era German ID tags based on observations made during the recovery of missing soldiers.
Newsreports showing WWII German soldiers being exhumed with their identification tags
A guide for Reenactors and Collectors
"What's your name soldier" - Video explaining the weaknesses of WWII German identification tags with examples of mistakes that occurred

Identity documents
Military life
Militaria